Genoplesium rhyoliticum, commonly known as the Pambula midge-orchid or rhyolite midge orchid and as Corunastylis rhyolitica in Australia, is a species of orchid endemic to New South Wales. It is a small orchid with up to eighteen dark, purplish-black flowers and is only known from six sites on the south coast where it grows in shallow soil over rhyolite.

Description 
There is a narrow triangular callus in the centre of the labellum and extending almost to its tip. Flowering occurs in December and January.

Taxonomy and naming 
Genoplesium rhyoliticum was first described in 1991 by David Jones and Mark Clements from a specimen collected near Pambula and the description was published in Australian orchid Research. In 2002 Jones and Clements changed the name to Corunastylis rhyolitica. The specific epithet (rhyoliticum) refers to the rock type on which this orchid grows.

Distribution and habitat 
The Pambula midge-orchid usually grows in very shallow soil over rhyolite without shrubs or trees, but sometimes under shrubs in heath. It only occurs in six sites near Pambula.

Conservation 
Of the six populations of G. rhyoliticum, three occur in the South East Forests National Park and the only known threat to the species is grazing by native mammals. The species is listed as "Endangered" under the New South Wales Threatened Species Conservation Act and the Commonwealth Government Environment Protection and Biodiversity Conservation Act 1999 (EPBC) Act.

References

External links 
 
 

rhyoliticum
Orchids of New South Wales
Endemic orchids of Australia
Plants described in 1989